Olga Mandrika (born 17 June 1993) is a Kazakhstani cross-country skier who competes internationally.

She competed for Kazakhstan at the FIS Nordic World Ski Championships 2017 in Lahti, Finland.

Cross-country skiing results
All results are sourced from the International Ski Federation (FIS).

World Championships

World Cup

References

External links 

1993 births
Living people
Kazakhstani female cross-country skiers
Universiade bronze medalists for Kazakhstan
Universiade medalists in cross-country skiing
Competitors at the 2013 Winter Universiade
Competitors at the 2015 Winter Universiade
Competitors at the 2017 Winter Universiade
Universiade silver medalists for Kazakhstan
21st-century Kazakhstani women